52nd parallel may refer to:

52nd parallel north, a circle of latitude in the Northern Hemisphere
52nd parallel south, a circle of latitude in the Southern Hemisphere